Phạm Bạch Hổ (910–972) was a warlord of Vietnam during the Period of the 12 Warlords. 

He was a general of Ngô Quyền and took part in Battle of Bạch Đằng. After Quyền's death, he occupied Đằng Châu (modern a part of Hưng Yên Province), and titled himself Phạm Phòng Át (范防遏). Later, he was defeated by Đinh Bộ Lĩnh. After the defeat, he remain with the title of Thân vệ Đại tướng quân (Bodyguard of the General).

References

910 births
972 deaths
10th-century Vietnamese people
People from Hải Dương province
Anarchy of the 12 Warlords
Đinh dynasty generals